The Federation of International Cricketers’ Associations (FICA) is an organisation that co-ordinates the activities of all the national players’ associations that represent  professional cricketers. Founded in 1998, FICA serves as the voice of the players within international cricket as it has a representative on the International Cricket Council's Cricketing "Playing" Committee, although its relationship with the ICC has not always been harmonious.

Objectives
The stated objectives of FICA are:

To promote the establishment of professional cricketers’ associations in countries where none currently exist.
To develop communication between these associations across the world, encouraging contact between them so that they speak with one voice on matters affecting cricket.
To ensure that individual associations are recognised by their domestic governing bodies and the ICC.
Through their local governing bodies, cricketers should have an input to all decisions affecting the professional game.
To protect the commercial interests of members of FICA.
To assist individual associations to raise finance to ensure the development of projects which benefit their members, present and past.

FICA members

Tim May
In June 2013, the first chief executive of FICA, Tim May, stepped down citing a lack of willingness in the International Cricket Council to bring in governance changes to tackle 'corruption and malpractice' within professional cricket.

Current officers

References

External links
 The Federation of International Cricketers Associations

Cricketers' associations
Sports professional associations
International professional associations
International sports organizations
Organizations established in 1998